Strictly Come Dancing is a South African reality dance competition television series produced for SABC2 by Rapid Blue, based on the British show of the same name. It was broadcast live from the Carlton Centre Ballroom, Johannesburg. The show premiered in South Africa on SABC2 on Saturday 4 February 2006, at 20:00hrs.

Presenters and judges

Presenter timeline
Colour key

Judges timeline
Colour key

Format 
South African celebrities are partnered with professional Latin and Ballroom dancers and must work each week on perfecting a dance routine.

Each week during a live show viewers are asked to vote for their favourite couple, and one couple (with the fewest votes) is eliminated.

In the season finale, two couples dance off to win the title and a cash prize of R40,000 (R20,000 per partner). The cash prize was first introduced for the third season.

Through sms voting, viewers vote who should stay and who should go, the results of the poll being combined with the ranking of the panel of judges.

For example: with 4 contestants left, the judges' favourite would receive 4 points, 2nd favourite 3 points, and so on, and similarly with the viewers' rankings. The two scores added together make the final score.

Seasons

Season 1 
The first season of Strictly Come Dancing aired from 4 February to 25 March 2006. A second season was ordered immediately based on the success of the first, and began just four months later, in August.

Judges 
The judging panel consists of:

 Lilian Phororo
 Dave Campbell
 Salome Sechele
 Tyrone Watkins

Each judge gives the performance a mark out of ten, giving an overall total out of 40.

Couples 
The eight celebrities to compete the first season were:

Season 2 

The second season of Strictly Come Dancing premiered on SABC2 on Saturday 5 August 2006 at 20:00.

In the second season, eight new South African celebrities coupled up with their own professional dancers and attempted to win the ballroom dancing showdown.

Celebrities for the season included soapie actors, a kwaito muso, a handyman, a beauty queen, a radio jock and a soccer star.

Judges 
The judging panel consists of:

 Lilian Phororo
 Dave Campbell
 Salome Sechele
 Tyrone Watkins

Each judge gives the performance a mark out of ten, giving an overall total out of 40.

Couples

Scores 

Red numbers indicate the lowest score for each week.
Green numbers indicate the highest score for each week.
 indicates the couple eliminated that week.
 indicates the returning couple that finished in the bottom two.
 indicates the winning couple.
 indicates the runner-up couple.
 indicates the third-place couple.

Season 3 

The third season of Strictly Come Dancing aired on SABC2 from 24 May to 12 July 2007, on Thursdays at 19h30.

Featuring eight new celebrity dancers who strutted their stuff with their professional dance partners, the show was broadcast in a new time and date format.

Instead of being  on Saturday nights between 20:00 and 21:30 as previous seasons were, the show was on Thursday nights at 19:30 for an initial hour episode in which each couple performed their dance for the week.

There was an hour break from 20:30 to give viewers time to vote and the show resumed for a half an hour results episode at 21:30.

It was the first season of the show that the winning couple had won a cash prize. The R40,000 was sponsored by the SABC.

The celebrity contestants included an Olympic medalist, a journalist, a rapper, an Afrikaans music superstar and a wildlife television host.

Judges 
The judging panel consists of:

 Lilian Phororo
 Dave Campbell
 Salome Sechele
 Tyrone Watkins

Each judge gives the performance a mark out of ten, giving an overall total out of 40.

Couples 
The eight celebrities to compete the third season were:

Scores

Dances performed

Season 4 

The fourth season of Strictly Come Dancing aired on SABC2 from 31 January to 20 March 2008, on Thursdays at 19:30. It was won by actor Emmanuel Castis and his partner Lindsey Muckle.

The first part (19:30–20:30) was where the contestants showed off their various dancing talents and the second part (21:30) where the results were revealed. Shot live from the Carlton Hotel Ballroom, the eight-part series was once again hosted by Ian von Memerty and Sandy Ngema.

Dance-off 

A new system called the dance-off was introduced in the fourth season. The Dance-Off is performed by the two couples with the lowest scores following the judges' scores and public vote.

After performing their dance again, the judges are asked one-by-one who they would like to save, and the couple with the most votes remains in the competition. If there is a tie, head judge Lilian Phororo has the deciding vote.

Judges 
The judging panel consists of:

 Lilian Phororo
 Dave Campbell
 Salome Sechele
 Tyrone Watkins

Each judge gives the performance a mark out of ten, giving an overall total out of 40.

Couples 
The celebrity contestants and their partners for this season were:

Scores 

Red numbers indicate the lowest score for each week.
Green numbers indicate the highest score for each week.
 indicates the couple eliminated that week.
 indicates the returning couple that finished in the bottom two and was in the Dance-off.
 indicates the winning couple.
 indicates the runner-up couple.
 indicates the third-place couple.

Dances performed 

 Highest scoring dance
 Lowest scoring dance

Season 5 

Season 5 premiered on SABC2 on Thursday 2 October 2008, at 19:30. There are 10 episodes in the fifth season.

It was preceded by a one-hour special, Strictly Come Dancing: The Story So Far, on Thursday 25 September, which took a retroactive look at past seasons and previewed the fifth season.

The first part (19:30–20:30) was where the contestants showed off their various dancing talents and the second part (21:30) where the results were revealed. Shot live from the Carlton Hotel Ballroom, the eight-part series was once again hosted by Ian von Memerty and Sandy Ngema.

A major change to the show this season came in the form of 10 couples who competed over 10 weeks – in past seasons eight couples competed over eight weeks.

The 10 celebrity couples lining up for the 5th season of SABC2's Strictly Come Dancing were announced on Wednesday 17 September 2008.

The celeb talent included an infamous comedian/actor, two well-known radio DJs, a racing car driver, an Afro-jazz pop-diva, an ex-Miss South Africa, a popular soapie star, a showjumping champion/model, a member/creator of a popular hip hop group and an ex-Gladiator.

Judges 
The judging panel consists of:

 Lilian Phororo
 Dave Campbell
 Salome Sechele
 Tyrone Watkins

Each judge gives the performance a mark out of ten, giving an overall total out of 40.

Couples 
The celebrity contestants and their partners for this season were:

Scores 

Red numbers indicate the lowest score for each week.
Green numbers indicate the highest score for each week.
 indicates the couple eliminated that week.
 indicates the returning couple that finished in the bottom two and werw in the Dance-off.
 indicates the couples that were in the Dance-off, but due to a computer mistake, it has no value to elimination next week.
 indicates the couple that was in the Dance-off, but due to a computer mistake, it was safe.
 indicates the winning couple.
 indicates the runner-up couple.
 indicates the third-place couple.

Dances performed 

 Highest scoring dance
 Lowest scoring dance
 Unscored dance

Series 6

Hosts 
 Marc Lottering
 Pabi Moloi

Judges 
The judging panel consists of:

 Samantha Peo
 Michael Wentink
 Tebogo Kgobokoe

Each judge gives the performance a mark out of ten, giving an overall total out of 30.

Couples 
The celebrity contestants and their partners for this season were:

Season 7
Season 7 started airing on 18 July 2014 on SABC 3. Live episodes are aired on Fridays from 20:00 to 21:45, with the results show airing the following day at 19:00. The results show is recorded directly after the live show.

Hosts 

Katlego Maboe
 Roxy Burger

Judges 
The judging panel consists of:

 Samantha Peo
 Michael Wentink
 Tebogo Kgobokoe

Each judge gives the performance a mark out of ten, giving an overall total out of 30.

Couples 
The celebrity contestants and their partners for this season were:

References

External links
 
 
 
 
 

2006 South African television series debuts
SABC 2 original programming
South African reality television series
South African music television series
Dancing with the Stars
South African television series based on British television series